Route 7 (Chinese: 七號幹線) is a major road linking Tseung Kwan O and Kwai Chung, through the northern part of Kowloon in Hong Kong.

The route was constructed in the 1960s, and consisted sections of Lung Cheung Road and Ching Cheung Road. It was built as a five lane dual carriageway to connect the factories in Kwun Tong with the Container Terminals, bypassing the built-up areas in Kowloon. The route was previously known as Route 4 and has been renamed in 2004. Following the opening of the Tseung Kwan O Tunnel in 1990, Route 7 was extended to Tseung Kwan O. Route 7 also the only route without Expressway

Route description

Route 7 begins at Wan Po Road in Tseung Kwan O and travels west to Kwun Tong via the Tseung Kwan O Tunnel. It follows Sau Mau Ping Road and meets Route 2 at Kwun Tong Bypass, then branches off into Kwun Tong Road. The road becomes a viaduct until it descends onto the ground level and joining Prince Edward Road East. The viaduct continues as Route 5 along the shore.

After Kowloon Bay, the road makes a few sharp bends before entering Lung Cheung Road. The route continues heading west and passes through the suburbs of Diamond Hill, Wong Tai Sin and Wang Tau Hom. The road becomes considerably steeper near the exit for Lion Rock Tunnel, and follows the foothills of northern Kowloon. At Tai Wo Ping, the route interchanges with Tai Po Road and continues as Ching Cheung Road, bypassing Sham Shui Po and Cheung Sha Wan before terminating at Kwai Chung and joins Route 5 again.

Some sections of the route are otherwise known as:
 Ching Cheung Road
 Lung Cheung Road
 Kwun Tong Road
 Tseung Kwan O Road
 Tseung Kwan O Tunnel and Tseung Kwan O Tunnel Road

Exits and Interchanges

See also
 Transport in Hong Kong

References

External links

 
Routes in Hong Kong